Laurence Bily (born 5 May 1963 in Bressuire) is a retired French sprinter, who specialized in the 100 meters. She ran for the Racing Club de France, and set a French junior record with 11.35 seconds in 1982 and a senior record with 11.04 in 1989.

International competitions

DNS = did not start. DNF = did not finish. DQ = disqualified.

1Did not start in the final2Representing Europe3Did not finish in the semifinals

External links

1963 births
Living people
People from Bressuire
Sportspeople from Deux-Sèvres
French female sprinters
Athletes (track and field) at the 1988 Summer Olympics
Athletes (track and field) at the 1992 Summer Olympics
Olympic athletes of France
European Athletics Championships medalists
World Athletics Championships athletes for France
Olympic female sprinters